Statistics of Campeonato da 1ª Divisão do Futebol in the 1991 season.

Overview
Sporting de Macau won the championship.

References
RSSSF

Campeonato da 1ª Divisão do Futebol seasons
Macau
Macau
football